Omer Bouchery (1882–1962) was a French illustrator.

1882 births
1962 deaths
French illustrators
Artists from Lille